José de Viera y Clavijo (28 December 1731 – 21 February 1813), was a Spanish, of Portuguese descent, Enlightenment ecclesiastic, poet, historian, botanist, ethnographer, and professor. He is best known for his exhaustive History of the Canary Islands (Historia de Canarias), which took 20 years of work. He was assisted by Fernando de Molina Quesada, José Vandewalle, and others. The first volume was published in 1773, the second in 1774, the third in 1775, and the fourth in 1781. He recognized the Canaries as belonging to Africa and was a proponent of atlantonationalism. He recorded various expeditions from the Canaries in search of Saint Brendan's Island that occurred from 1487 to 1759. He investigated the influence of maritime activities in the Atlantic Ocean on the development of the islands. He was an admirer of Benito Jerónimo Feijóo y Montenegro and Voltaire, having been considered by scholarship after his time the "spiritual son" of the former.

Biography
Viera was born in Realejo Alto, on the island of Tenerife. He was the son of notary and town mayor, Gabriel Álamo y Viera and his wife Antonia María Clavijo. As a child his family moved to La Orotava, where he was educated in scholastic theology at the convent of Santo Domingo. As stated in his memoir, it was here he grew fond of Benito Jerónimo Feijóo y Montenegro's work. At 18 years old, he received his minor orders in La Laguna; at 24 he got a preaching license; at 25 he entered major orders as a priest in Las Palmas.

In 1756, he began service as a priest at Los Remdios Church in La Laguna, residing there for 14 years. Here he also pursued a wide variety of poetry: funeral prayers, loas, odes, and panegyrics. In 1770, he moved to Madrid and became the aide and preceptor of 's son, Francisco de Asís, receiving his patronage in return. For 14 years, he traveled Europe with the marquis and met scientific and literary thinkers such as Félix de Azara, Francisco Javier Lampillas, Jean le Rond d'Alembert, Pietro Metastasio, and Voltaire; from these traveling introductions he befriended Charles Messier, Jérôme Lalande, and Antonio José Cavanilles. Cavanilles taught him personal courses in chemistry and natural history, in turn affecting his writing. He became a corresponding member of the Real Academia de la Historia in 1774 and made supernumerary by Pedro Rodríguez, Count of Campomanes in 1777.

In 1783, he returned to the Las Palmas Cathedral as archdeacon, never leaving the island afterward and dying on 21 February 1813 in the city. His remains were put in the cathedral. He is commemorated in the name of the Jardín Botánico Canario Viera y Clavijo.

Works
Vida del noticioso Jorge Sargo, 1745
Papel Hebdomadario, 1758 and 1759
Memoriales del Síndico Personero, 1764
Gacetas de Daute, 1765
Carta filosófica sobre la Aurora boreal, 1770
Historia de Canarias (4 volumes), 1773, 1774, 1775, and 1781
El segundo Agatócles Cortés en la Nueva España, 1778
Elogio de Felipe V, 1779
Elogio de Don Alonso el Pintado, 1782
El Hyerotheo, o Tratado Histórico de los antiguos honores y derechos del Presbiterio, 1799
Diccionario de Historia natural de las Islas Canarias, 1799
Noticias de la Tierra, 1807
Noticias del cielo, 1811
Los Vasconautas, undated
Tragedia de Santa Genoveva, undated

References

Bibliography

 

1731 births
1813 deaths
People from Tenerife
Enlightenment scientists
18th-century Spanish historians
18th-century Spanish botanists
18th-century Spanish poets
Spanish ethnographers
Members of the Real Academia de la Historia